Pelochyta cervina is a moth of the family Erebidae. It was described by Henry Edwards in 1884. It is found in Mexico and Guatemala.

References

Pelochyta
Moths described in 1884